Sheree Horvath (born 7 April 1980) is a New Zealand field hockey player who competed in the 2008 Summer Olympics.

References

External links
 

1980 births
Living people
New Zealand female field hockey players
Olympic field hockey players of New Zealand
Field hockey players at the 2008 Summer Olympics
20th-century New Zealand women
21st-century New Zealand women